Thadiya is a village or Gram panchayat village in shekhala Tehsil Jodhpur district, Rajasthan, India. In the Thadiya village many government and private school are available . There are a number of temples such as Guru Jambheshwar Mandir and Baba Ramdev temple. There is a sub-post office.At the time Thadiya is a very developed village in nearly area.

Nearby places
Nathrau 18 Km, Dewatu, Dechu 8 Km, Gilakor, Lorta 8 Km Peelwa and Kanodiya Purohitan etc.

References

Villages in Jodhpur district